We Are Drugs is a studio EP by American alternative rock band Third Eye Blind. Preceded by the singles "Cop vs. Phone Girl" and "Company of Strangers", We Are Drugs was released on October 7, 2016.

Background
As early as 2012, Third Eye Blind frontman Stephan Jenkins stated that following the release of their fifth album, they would cease releasing full albums, in favor of smaller EP releases. After the band released their fifth album, Dopamine, in June 2015, Jenkins stated there were five to six songs from the Dopamine sessions that—once he had time to finish them after the band finished touring to support Dopamine—he would want to release. Several months later, Jenkins began discussing plans for a new EP release in mid-2016.

Writing and recording 
Contrary to the band's previous few albums—Out of the Vein (2003), Ursa Major (2009), and Dopamine (2015), which were recorded over the course of four to six years—the band was limited to only one week in a studio in Texas in early 2016 to record We Are Drugs. Jenkins stated that the success of Dopamine finally allowed him to stop obsessing over perfecting lyrics, something he had done in the past. The band focused on continuous sessions that would take a song from conception to completion. No guidelines or definitions of what the music should be or sound like were permitted during the sessions; this allowed the band to create the music they felt in the time they were working on it. Lyrics and vocals for the track "Weightless," however, were completed outside of the initial sessions: Jenkins did not complete either until September 13, 2016—only three weeks before the EP was released.

Themes and composition
Jenkins states that the EP's name is meant to tie into their preceding album Dopamine, with drugs being something that affects one's dopamine levels. Containing lyrics referencing Black Lives Matter, police brutality, and racism, the EP's first single, "Cop vs. Phone Girl," was strongly socially conscious and politically themed. Its lyrics were based on the events of the "Spring Valley High School Incident" in 2015 when a campus police officer violently yanked a Black American student from her seat during class.

The EP's cover art, inspired by Salvador Dalí's Un Chien Andalou, was a collaboration between Jenkins and photographer Travis Shinn.

Release and promotion
The EP's first single—"Cop vs. Phone Girl"—was released on July 25, 2016 on the heels of the band's entering the national spotlight over their comments about the Republican Party: On July 19, 2016, the band played a benefit concert, in proximity to the Republican National Convention, for Musicians on Call (a charity organization). The band took the opportunity to speak out against the GOP, criticizing the party's views on science and LGBT rights; they played tracks specifically critical of Republican Party stances, including "Jumper" and "Non-Dairy Creamer." The event inspired the band to release a political single. In tandem with the announcement of the EP's track listing and release date, "Company of Strangers," the opening song on We Are Drugs, was released for streaming on September 8, 2016.

The band played the 2016 iteration of Lollapalooza to promote the EP as well.

Track listing

Personnel
Stephan Jenkins – lead vocals, rhythm guitar
Kryz Reid – lead guitar, backing vocals
Alex LeCavalier – bass guitar
Alex Kopp – keyboard
Brad Hargreaves – drums

Charts

References

2016 EPs
Third Eye Blind albums